Standley may refer to:

Joseph E. Standley, founder of Ye Olde Curiosity Shop in Seattle, Washington, United States, in 1899
Julia Standley, died during the 1974 Huntsville Prison Siege in the Texas State Penitentiary
Paul Carpenter Standley (1884–1963), American botanist
William Harrison Standley (1872–1963), U.S. admiral

See also
Admiral William Standley State Recreation Area, state recreation area of California, USA
Standley Lake, 1,000-acre lake located in Westminster, Colorado
Standley Lake High School, public secondary school in Westminster, Colorado, United States
USS William H. Standley (CG-32), Belknap-class destroyer leader / cruiser
Standee
Standel
Standen
Stanley (disambiguation)
Stanly (disambiguation)